Gérald A. Beaudoin  (April 15, 1929 – September 10, 2008) was a Canadian lawyer and Senator.

Born in Montreal, Quebec, he received a B.A., an LL.L and an M.A. from the Université de Montréal. He was called to the Quebec Bar in 1954.

He was appointed to the Senate in 1988 representing the Senatorial division of Rigaud, Quebec. He retired at the mandatory age of 75 in 2004. He sat as a Progressive Conservative and then as a Conservative.

After his political career, he taught constitutional law at the faculty of civil law at the University of Ottawa.

Honours
In 1980, he was made an Officer of the Order of Canada. In 2001, he was made a Commander of the Order of the Crown. In 2004 he received the French Legion of Honour. In 2008, he was made an Officer of the National Order of Quebec.

References

External links
 

1929 births
2008 deaths
Canadian senators from Quebec
Conservative Party of Canada senators
Fellows of the Royal Society of Canada
Recipients of the Legion of Honour
Officers of the Order of Canada
Officers of the National Order of Quebec
Commanders of the Order of the Crown (Belgium)
Progressive Conservative Party of Canada senators
Université de Montréal alumni
Politicians from Montreal
21st-century Canadian politicians
Canadian scholars of constitutional law